Ousseynou Cavin Diagné (born 5 June 1999) is a Senegalese football midfielder who plays for ES Zarzis.

He played youth football for Cádiz CF and had modest spells in Le Mans and Club Brugge II before moving to his fourth European country, signing for Kristiansund BK in February 2020. He made his Eliteserien debut in July 2020 against Bodø/Glimt. In 2021 he trialled with Raufoss IL, but stayed with Kristiansund. He was however released in late May 2021.

Internationally, he was a squad member for the 2017 Africa U-20 Cup of Nations, the 2019 Africa U-20 Cup of Nations and the 2019 FIFA U-20 World Cup.

References

1999 births
Living people
Footballers from Dakar
Senegalese footballers
Senegal youth international footballers
Le Mans FC players
Club NXT players
Kristiansund BK players
ES Zarzis players
Eliteserien players
Tunisian Ligue Professionnelle 1 players
Association football midfielders
Senegalese expatriate footballers
Expatriate footballers in Spain
Senegalese expatriate sportspeople in Spain
Expatriate footballers in France
Senegalese expatriate sportspeople in France
Expatriate footballers in Belgium
Senegalese expatriate sportspeople in Belgium
Expatriate footballers in Norway
Senegalese expatriate sportspeople in Norway
Expatriate footballers in Tunisia
Senegalese expatriate sportspeople in Tunisia